The Tezno District is a city district of the City Municipality of Maribor in northeastern Slovenia. In 2014, the district had a population of 11,732. After World War II, a large trench in Tezno became a major mass grave, which was later investigated by the Commission on Concealed Mass Graves in Slovenia.

References

External links

Districts of the City Municipality of Maribor